Dariusz Zawadzki (born 18 June 1982 in Krakow) is a Polish footballer who last played for Kolejarz Stróże.

Career

Club
In January 2010, he joined Pogoń Szczecin. He was released from Pogoń on 10 June 2011.

In June 2011, he joined Kolejarz Stróże.

References

External links
 

1982 births
Living people
Polish footballers
Poland youth international footballers
Wisła Kraków players
Arka Gdynia players
ŁKS Łódź players
Proszowianka Proszowice players
MKS Cracovia (football) players
Wisła Płock players
Sandecja Nowy Sącz players
Pogoń Szczecin players
Kolejarz Stróże players
Skra Częstochowa players
Footballers from Kraków
Association football midfielders